"Can I Play with Madness" is a song by the English heavy metal band Iron Maiden. The song is the sixteenth single released by the band. Released in 1988, it was the first single from their seventh studio album, Seventh Son of a Seventh Son (1988), and hit number 3 in the UK Singles Chart.

The song is about a young man who wants to learn the future from an old prophet with a crystal ball. The young man thinks he is going mad and seeks the old prophet to help him cope with his visions/nightmares. The prophet's advice is ignored by the young man and they become angry with each other. The song was originally a ballad named "On the Wings of Eagles", written by Adrian Smith.

Cash Box called it "raging, pulsating metal that should shake up a few speaker cabinets and damage eardrums."

Music video 
The video of the song was set at Tintern Abbey and Chislehurst Caves, and features Monty Python’s Graham Chapman; this would be one of his last appearances on television before his death in October 1989 of cancer. In the video, Chapman plays an irritable art instructor who criticizes a young student for including Iron Maiden's mascot Eddie in his sketch of the abbey ruins. The teacher then falls down a hole in the ground, discovers an underground vault and finally encounters an animated version of Eddie, who leers at him from inside a refrigerator. The band appears on a TV screen showing footage from "The Number of the Beast" video and the Live After Death concert film. Adrian Smith is shown playing left-handed, suggesting a reversed image.

Track listing 
7" single

12" single

Other uses 
The song was used by Sony in advertisements for their line of HD-compatible television sets and DVD players. It was also used by Sony in the UK during the bumpers for their sponsorship of ITV's coverage of the 2008 Formula One season, until it got replaced by Def Leppard's "Rocket" after 4 rounds of the season.

The song also featured in the UK version of Now That's What I Call Music 12 in 1988.

A live version of the song (the one from the DVD as performed in Mexico) was used as background music for the TV trailer of the movie Iron Maiden: Flight 666. The song is also featured on the film's soundtrack album.

Black Bart Blues

"Black Bart Blues" is a song by the English heavy metal band Iron Maiden. It appears as a B-side of the "Can I Play with Madness" single. The song is about the suit of armour that rode in the back lounge of the band's tour buses (named Black Bart). Vocalist Bruce Dickinson tells that he, his bandmates and their tour manager were driving in a Ford Thunderbird through Florida in 1983, when they passed a gas station with three suits of armour standing outside. Dickinson stopped the car and went to buy one of the three suits of armour that were on sale. The song's lyrics detail a rather infamous story in which a girl stumbled onto the band's tour bus and struck a deal with one of the band members that she'd give them oral sex in exchange for alcohol.

The song ends with clips of drummer Nicko McBrain that were taken during the Seventh Son of a Seventh Son sessions.

Personnel
Production credits are adapted from the 7 inch vinyl cover.
Bruce Dickinson - lead vocals
Dave Murray - guitar
Adrian Smith - guitar, guitar synthesizer
Steve Harris - bass guitar
Nicko McBrain - drums
Production
Martin Birch – producer, engineer, mixing
Derek Riggs – cover illustration
Ross Halfin – photography

Chart performance

Notes

References

Iron Maiden songs
1988 singles
Songs written by Adrian Smith
Songs written by Steve Harris (musician)
Songs written by Bruce Dickinson
1988 songs
EMI Records singles